Luis Clemente Enriquez (August 23, 1932 – October 12, 2001), better known by his stage name Eddie Rodriguez, was a Filipino film actor and director.

Early life
Enriquez was born on August 23, 1932, in Zamboanga City. He spent his childhood and teen years in Sta. Ana, Manila. During the Japanese occupation, with his parents and two siblings, he moved temporarily to Ragay, Camarines Sur which was the birthplace of his mother, Rufina Clemente-Enriquez.

Personal life
In the 1970s, Rodriguez was in a relationship with Carmen Soriano, a popular Filipino singer. He was married to Araceli Hernandez with 3 children: Sheena Natassha H. Enriquez (born 1985), Dominique Louise Enriquez, and Bianca H. Enriquez.

Career
With his wife, the actress Liza Moreno (Louise de Mesa), the couple formed Virgo Film Productions. Rodriguez was paired with practically all the queens of Philippine movies from Gloria Romero, Nida Blanca, Rita Gomez, Charito Solis, Amalia Fuentes, Nora Aunor and Vilma Santos.

He directed Sharon Cuneta‚ and megablockbuster Maging Sino Ka Man with Robin Padilla.

Rodriguez was rumored to have an illness before and reportedly became an alcoholic.

He started as an action star before turning to drama where he became more popular.

He was remembered for his films Sapagkat Kami ay Tao Lamang, Kapag Puso Ay Sinugatan, Malupit Na Pag-ibig and Nakakahiya Part 1 and 2.

He was posthumously inducted to the Philippines Eastwood City Walk Of Fame in 2006.

Death
Rodriguez died of cardiac arrest on October 12, 2001, at 11:30 pm Friday night, at The Medical City, Pasig. According to his daughter Sheena, her father had suffered lung cancer several years ago and one of his lungs had to be surgically removed.

Filmography

Actor

Director

Story

Screenplay

Writer

References

1932 births
2001 deaths
20th-century screenwriters
21st-century American politicians
Deaths from lung cancer in the Philippines
Filipino film directors
Filipino male film actors
Filipino screenwriters
People from Santa Ana, Manila
People from Zamboanga City